In mathematics, and especially in algebraic geometry, the intersection number generalizes the intuitive notion of counting the number of times two curves intersect to higher dimensions, multiple (more than 2) curves, and accounting properly for tangency. One needs a definition of intersection number in order to state results like Bézout's theorem.

The intersection number is obvious in certain cases, such as the intersection of the x- and y-axes in a plane, which should be one. The complexity enters when calculating intersections at points of tangency, and intersections which are not just points, but have higher dimension. For example, if a plane is tangent to a surface along a line, the intersection number along the line should be at least two. These questions are discussed systematically in intersection theory.

Definition for Riemann surfaces 

Let X be a Riemann surface. Then the intersection number of two closed curves on X has a simple definition in terms of an integral. For every closed curve c on X (i.e., smooth function ), we can associate a differential form  of compact support, the Poincaré dual of c, with the property that integrals along c can be calculated by integrals over X:

, for every closed (1-)differential  on X,

Then the intersection number of two closed curves, a and b, on X is defined as

.

The  have an intuitive definition as follows. They are a sort of dirac delta along the curve c, accomplished by taking the differential of a unit step function that drops from 1 to 0 across c. More formally, we begin by defining for a simple closed curve c on X, a function fc by letting  be a small strip around c in the shape of an annulus. Then define fc by

.

The definition is then expanded to arbitrary closed curves.

, for every differential .

.

Definition for algebraic varieties 

The usual constructive definition in the case of algebraic varieties proceeds in steps. The definition given below is for the intersection number of divisors on a nonsingular variety X.

1. The only intersection number that can be calculated directly from the definition is the intersection of hypersurfaces (subvarieties of X of codimension one) that are in general position at x. Specifically, assume we have a nonsingular variety X, and n hypersurfaces Z1, ..., Zn which have local equations f1, ..., fn near x for polynomials fi(t1, ..., tn), such that the following hold:

 .
  for all i. (i.e., x is in the intersection of the hypersurfaces.)
  (i.e., the divisors are in general position.)
 The  are nonsingular at x.

Then the intersection number at the point x (called the intersection multiplicity at x) is

,

where  is the local ring of X at x, and the dimension is dimension as a k-vector space. It can be calculated as the localization , where  is the maximal ideal of polynomials vanishing at x, and U is an open affine set containing x and containing none of the singularities of the fi.

2. The intersection number of hypersurfaces in general position is then defined as the sum of the intersection numbers at each point of intersection.

3. Extend the definition to effective divisors by linearity, i.e.,

4. Extend the definition to arbitrary divisors in general position by noticing every divisor has a unique expression as D = P – N for some effective divisors P and N. So let Di = Pi – Ni, and use rules of the form

to transform the intersection.

5. The intersection number of arbitrary divisors is then defined using a "Chow's moving lemma" that guarantees we can find linearly equivalent divisors that are in general position, which we can then intersect.

Note that the definition of the intersection number does not depend on the order in which the divisors appear in the computation of this number.

Serre's Tor formula 
Let V and W be two subvarieties of a nonsingular projective variety X such that dim(V) + dim(W) = dim(X). Then we expect the intersection V ∩ W to be a finite set of points. If we try to count them, two kinds of problems may arise. First, even if the expected dimension of V ∩ W is zero, the actual intersection may be of a large dimension: for example the self-intersection number of a projective line in a projective plane. The second potential problem is that even if the intersection is zero-dimensional, it may be non-transverse, for example, if V is a plane curve and W is one of its tangent lines.

The first problem requires the machinery of intersection theory, discussed above in detail, which replaces V and W by more convenient subvarieties using the moving lemma. On the other hand, the second problem can be solved directly, without moving V or W. In 1965 Jean-Pierre Serre described how to find the multiplicity of each intersection point by methods of commutative algebra and homological algebra. This connection between a geometric notion of intersection and a homological notion of a derived tensor product has been influential and led in particular to several homological conjectures in commutative algebra.

Serre's Tor formula states: let X be a regular variety, V and W two subvarieties of complementary dimension such that V ∩ W is zero-dimensional. For any point x ∈ V ∩ W, let A be the local ring  of x. The structure sheaves of V and W at x correspond to ideals I, J ⊆ A. Then the multiplicity of V ∩ W at the point x is

where length is the length of a module over a local ring, and Tor is the Tor functor. When V and W can be moved into a transverse position, this homological formula produces the expected answer. So, for instance, if V and W meet transversely at x, the multiplicity is 1. If V is a tangent line at a point x to a parabola W in a plane at a point x, then the multiplicity at x is 2.

If both V and W are locally cut out by regular sequences, for example if they are nonsingular, then in the formula above all higher Tor's vanish, hence the multiplicity is positive. The positivity in the arbitrary case is one of Serre's multiplicity conjectures.

Further definitions 

The definition can be vastly generalized, for example to intersections along subvarieties instead of just at points, or to arbitrary complete varieties.

In algebraic topology, the intersection number appears as the Poincaré dual of the cup product. Specifically, if two manifolds, X and Y, intersect transversely in a manifold M, the homology class of the intersection is the Poincaré dual of the cup product  of the Poincaré duals of X and Y.

Snapper–Kleiman definition of intersection number 
There is an approach to intersection number, introduced by Snapper in 1959-60 and developed later by Cartier and Kleiman, that defines an intersection number as an Euler characteristic.

Let X be a scheme over a scheme S, Pic(X) the Picard group of X and G the Grothendieck group of the category of coherent sheaves on X whose support is proper over an Artinian subscheme of S.

For each L in Pic(X), define the endomorphism c1(L) of G (called the first Chern class of L) by

It is additive on G since tensoring with a line bundle is exact. One also has:
; in particular,  and  commute.

 (this is nontrivial and follows from a dévissage argument.)
The intersection number

of line bundles Li's is then defined by:

where χ denotes the Euler characteristic. Alternatively, one has by induction:

Each time F is fixed,  is a symmetric functional in Li's.

If Li = OX(Di) for some Cartier divisors Di's, then we will write  for the intersection number.

Then
.

Intersection multiplicities for plane curves 

 
  if and only if  and  have a common factor that is zero at 
  where 
 
  for any 

Although these properties completely characterize intersection multiplicity, in practice it is realised in several different ways.

One realization of intersection multiplicity is through the dimension of a certain quotient space of the power series ring . By making a change of variables if necessary, we may assume that . Let  and  be the polynomials defining the algebraic curves we are interested in. If the original equations are given in homogeneous form, these can be obtained by setting .

Intersection multiplicity can also be realised as the number of distinct intersections that exist if the curves are perturbed slightly. We say then that .

Example 
Consider the intersection of the x-axis with the parabola

Then

and

so

 

Thus, the intersection degree is two; it is an ordinary tangency.

Self-intersections 

Some of the most interesting intersection numbers to compute are self-intersection numbers. This means that a  divisor is moved to another equivalent divisor in general position with respect to the first, and the two are intersected. In this way, self-intersection numbers can become well-defined, and even negative.

Applications 

The intersection number is partly motivated by the desire to define intersection to satisfy Bézout's theorem.

The intersection number arises in the study of fixed points, which can be cleverly defined as intersections of function graphs with a diagonals. Calculating the intersection numbers at the fixed points counts the fixed points with multiplicity, and leads to the Lefschetz fixed-point theorem in quantitative form.

Notes

References 
 
  Appendix A.
 
 Algebraic Curves: An Introduction To Algebraic Geometry, by William Fulton with Richard Weiss. New York: Benjamin, 1969. Reprint ed.: Redwood City, CA, USA: Addison-Wesley, Advanced Book Classics, 1989. . Full text online.
 

Algebraic geometry